The Shambe National Park is a national park in South Sudan, located on the west bank of the White Nile.

The national game park is in the remote area of Adior and extend southward to Amath-akut in Malek payam near Ramciel.
Another name for Shambe is "Anyoop”.

It was primarily established to provide protection to certain wild animals, such as foxes, monkeys, lions, gazelles, giraffes and ostriches.

References

National parks of South Sudan
Protected areas established in 1985
1985 establishments in Sudan
Northern Congolian forest–savanna mosaic